{{Infobox officeholder
| honorific-prefix = The Right Honourable
| name             = The Earl of Derby
| honorific-suffix = 
| image            = Edward Stanley, 15th Earl of Derby 2.jpg
| imagesize        = 200px
| office          = Secretary of State for the Colonies
| term_start      = 16 December
1882
| term_end        = 9 June 1885
| monarch         = Victoria
| primeminister   = William Ewart Gladstone
| predecessor     = The Earl of Kimberley
| successor       = Frederick Stanley
| term_start1      = 26 February 1858
| term_end1        = 5 June 1858
| monarch1         = Victoria
| primeminister1   = The Earl of Derby 
| predecessor1     = Henry Labouchere
| successor1       = Edward Bulwer-Lytton
| office2          = Secretary of State for Foreign Affairs
| term_start3      = 6 July 1866
| term_end3        = 9 December 1868
| monarch3         = Victoria
| primeminister3   = The Earl of Derby  Benjamin Disraeli
| predecessor3     = The Earl of Clarendon
| successor3       = The Earl of Clarendon
| term_start2      = 21 February 1874
| term_end2        = 2 April 1878
| monarch2         = Victoria
| primeminister2   = Benjamin Disraeli
| predecessor2     = The Earl Granville
| successor2       = The Marquess of Salisbury
| office4          = Secretary of State for India
| term_start4      = 2 August 1858
| term_end4        = 11 June 1859
| predecessor4     = Office established(himself as the President of the Board of Control)
| successor4       = The Viscount of Halifax
| office5          = President of the Board of Control
| term_start5      = 5 June 1858
| term_end5        = 2 August 1858
| predecessor5     = The Earl of Ellenborough
| successor5       = Office abolished<small>(himself as the Secretary of State for India)</small>
| office7          = Parliamentary Under-Secretary of State for Foreign Affairs
| term_start7      = 18 May 1852
| term_end7        = 28 December 1852
| monarch7         = Victoria
| primeminister7   = The Earl of Derby
| predecessor7     = Austen Henry Layard
| successor7       = The Lord Wodehouse
| office8            = Member of the House of LordsLord Temporal
| term_start8        = 24 October 1869
| term_end8          = 21 April 1893Hereditary Peerage
| predecessor8       = The 14th Earl of Derby
| successor8         = The 16th Earl of Derby
| office9             = Member of Parliamentfor King's Lynn
| term_start9         = 1848
| term_end9           = 1869Serving with Robert Jocelyn, John Henry Gurney Sr. and Sir Fowell Buxton, 3rd Baronet
| predecessor9        = Lord George Bentinck
| successor9          = Lord Claud Hamilton
| birth_date       = 
| death_date       = 
| nationality      = British
| party            = Conservative
| alma_mater       = Trinity College, Cambridge
| spouse           = Lady Mary Sackville-West  (m. 1870; his death 1893)
| parents          = Edward Smith-Stanley, 14th Earl of DerbyEmma Caroline Bootle-Wilbraham
}}

Edward Henry Stanley, 15th Earl of Derby,  (21 July 182621 April 1893; known as Lord Stanley from 1851 to 1869) was a British statesman. He served as Secretary of State for Foreign Affairs twice, from 1866 to 1868 and from 1874 to 1878, and also twice as Colonial Secretary in 1858 and from 1882 to 1885.

Background and education
He was born to Edward Smith-Stanley, 14th Earl of Derby, who led the Conservative Party from 1846 to 1868 and served as Prime Minister three times, and Emma Caroline Bootle-Wilbraham, daughter of Edward Bootle-Wilbraham, 1st Baron Skelmersdale, and was the older brother of Frederick Arthur Stanley, 16th Earl of Derby, for whom the NHL's Stanley Cup is named. The Stanleys were one of the richest landowning families in England. Lord Stanley, as he was styled before acceding to the earldom, was educated at Eton, Rugby and Trinity College, Cambridge, where he took a first in classics and became a member of the society known as the Cambridge Apostles.

Political career
In March 1848 he unsuccessfully contested the borough of Lancaster, and then made a long tour in the West Indies, Canada and the United States. During his absence, he was elected member for King's Lynn, which he represented till October 1869, when he succeeded to the peerage. He took his place, as a matter of course, among the Conservatives, and delivered his maiden speech in May 1850 on the sugar duties. Just before, he had made a very brief tour in Jamaica and South America. In 1852 he went to India, and while travelling in that country, he was appointed under-secretary for foreign affairs in his father's first administration. On 11 March 1853, he was commissioned a captain in the 3rd Royal Lancashire Militia.

From the outset of his career, he was known to be more politically sympathetic to the Liberals rather than the Conservatives, and in 1855 Lord Palmerston offered him the post of Secretary of State for the Colonies. He was much tempted by the proposal, and hurried down to Knowsley to consult his father, who called out when he entered the room, "Halo, Stanley! what brings you here?—Has Dizzy cut his throat, or are you going to be married?" When the object of his sudden appearance had been explained, the Conservative chief received the courteous suggestion of the prime minister with anything but favour, and the offer was declined. On 13 May 1856, he was appointed to the Royal Commission on the purchase of commissions in the British army. In his father's second administration Lord Stanley held, at first, the office of Secretary of State for the Colonies (1858), but became President of the Board of Control on the resignation of Lord Ellenborough. He had the charge of the India Bill of 1858 in the House of Commons, became the first Secretary of State for India, and left behind him in the India Office an excellent reputation as a man of business.

After the revolution in Greece and the flight of King Otto, Queen Victoria's second son, Prince Alfred, was the Greek people's choice as their next king. After he declined, the idea arose of electing a great and wealthy English nobleman, in the open hope that although they might have to offer him a Civil List, he would decline to receive it. Lord Stanley was the favourite candidate. However, despite reports to the contrary, he was, in fact, never formally offered the crown.

Foreign minister 1866-68 
After the fall of the Russell government in 1866 he became Secretary of State for Foreign Affairs in his father's third administration. He compared his conduct in that great post to that of a man floating down a river and fending off from his vessel, as well as he could, the various obstacles it encountered. He enunciated the policy of Splendid isolation in 1866:
it is the duty of the Government of this country, placed as it is with regard to geographical position, to keep itself upon terms of goodwill with all surrounding nations, but not to entangle itself with any single or monopolizing alliance with any one of them; above all to endeavor not to interfere needlessly and vexatiously with the internal affairs of any foreign country."

He arranged the collective guarantee of the neutrality of Luxembourg in 1867, likely to be a theatre of war with the conflict between France and Prussia growing ever more likely. He also negotiated a convention with the USA about the CSS Alabama, which, however, was not ratified, and refused to take any part in the troubles in Crete.

Foreign Minister 1874-78
In 1874 he again became Foreign Secretary in Disraeli's government. In 1875 came the purchase of the controlling shares in the Suez Canal Company. By negotiations, Russia gave up substantial gains in the Balkans and a foothold in the Mediterranean. Britain gained control of Cyprus from the Ottomans as a naval base covering the Eastern Mediterranean. In exchange, Britain guaranteed the Asiatic territories of the Ottoman Empire. Britain did not do well in conflicts in Afghanistan and South Africa.

Derby acquiesced in Disraeli's purchase of the Suez Canal shares, a measure then considered dangerous by many people, but ultimately most successful. He accepted the Andrassy Note, but declined to accede to the Berlin Memorandum. Derby's conduct during the Eastern Crisis was mysterious to many of his contemporaries and for some time thereafter. Derby's hope for peace with Russia led him (and his wife) to share Cabinet secrets with the Russian ambassador, Pyotr Shuvalov, in hopes of averting war with Russia. Robert Blake commented that "Derby surely must be the only Foreign Secretary in British history to reveal the innermost secrets of the Cabinet to the ambassador of a foreign power in order to frustrate the presumed intentions of his own Prime Minister." Derby resigned in January 1878 when the Cabinet resolved to send the British fleet through the Dardanelles, but when that action soon proved unnecessary, Derby was allowed to withdraw his resignation. However, he resigned again and finally in the same year when the Cabinet agreed to call up the reserve.

By October 1879, it was clear enough that he had thrown in his lot with the Liberal Party, but it was not till March 1880 that he publicly announced this change of allegiance. He did not at first take office in the second Gladstone government, but became Colonial Secretary in December 1882, holding this position till the fall of that government in the summer of 1885. In 1886 the Liberal party split; Lord Derby became a Liberal Unionist, and took an active part in the general management of that party, leading it in the House of Lords till 1891, when Lord Hartington became Duke of Devonshire. In 1892 he presided over the Labour Commission.

He served as President of the first day of the 1881 Co-operative Congress.

Personal life
Lord Derby married Lady Mary, daughter of George Sackville-West, 5th Earl De La Warr and widow of James Gascoyne-Cecil, 2nd Marquess of Salisbury, in 1870. They had no children. Derby's health never recovered from an attack of influenza which he had in 1891, and he died at Knowsley on 21 April 1893, aged 66. He was succeeded in the earldom by his younger brother, Frederick. Lady Derby died in December 1900.

Notes

Further reading
 Saintsbury, George. The earl of Derby (1892)  online
 Wilson, Keith M., ed. British foreign secretaries and foreign policy: from Crimean War to First World War (Routledge Kegan & Paul, 1987)

 Primary sources
 Derby, Edward Henry Stanley. Disraeli, Derby, and the Conservative Party: Journals and Memoirs of Edward Henry, Lord Stanley, 1849–1869'' (Harvester Press, 1978)

External links

 
 

1826 births
1893 deaths
British Militia officers
British Secretaries of State for Foreign Affairs
Liberal Party (UK) MPs for English constituencies
Liberal Party (UK) hereditary peers
Liberal Unionist Party peers
Presidents of the Royal Statistical Society
Children of prime ministers of the United Kingdom
Knights of the Garter
Alumni of Trinity College, Cambridge
Chancellors of the University of London
Rectors of the University of Edinburgh
Rectors of the University of Glasgow
UK MPs 1847–1852
UK MPs 1852–1857
UK MPs 1857–1859
UK MPs 1859–1865
UK MPs 1865–1868
UK MPs 1868–1874
Derby, E15
Presidents of Co-operative Congress
People educated at Eton College
People educated at Rugby School
Members of the Privy Council of the United Kingdom
Fellows of the Royal Society
Fellows of King's College London
Edward
Deaths from influenza
15
Secretaries of State for the Colonies
Secretaries of State for India
Presidents of the Board of Control